He Jingtang (born 1938 Dongguan) is a Chinese architect and the head of the architecture program at the South China University of Technology's school of architecture whose works include the wrestling and badminton venues built for the 2008 Beijing Olympics and the Chinese Pavilion sometimes referred to as the "Crown of China" for Expo 2010 which was held in Shanghai and later reopened as the China Art Museum. More recently designed the new campus of the University of Macau which was completed in 2013.

In 2016 the Dachang Muslim Cultural Center designed by He opened outside Beijing.  It features a colonnade of petal-shaped arches that in turn give birth to an illuminated walkway around the outline of cultural centre

He participated in the 2016 Venice Biennale of Architecture, in an exhibit named "PLACE, CULTURE, TIME He Jingtang: Design for Drastically Changing China”".

References

Notes

External links
Profile for the South China University of Technology - 
University of Macau project - 

1938 births
Living people
Chinese architects
People from Dongguan
Artists from Guangdong
Academic staff of the South China University of Technology
South China University of Technology alumni
Members of the Chinese Academy of Engineering